is a Japanese original anime television series created by Spider Lily and Asaura. It was produced by A-1 Pictures and aired from July to September 2022. 

A manga adaptation by Yasunori Bizen began serialization in Media Factory's manga magazine Monthly Comic Flapper in September 2022, and a spin-off light novel, titled Lycoris Recoil: Ordinary Days by Asaura was published under ASCII Media Works' Dengeki Bunko in September 2022 as well. A stage play adaptation of the series was performed in January 2023.

Plot
Takina Inoue is a member of a government-sponsored all-female task force of assassins and spies made up of orphans known as "Lycoris", an undercover group (named after the flower) who eliminate criminals and terrorists in Tokyo while disguised as high school students to maintain peace in Japan, with roots in a fictional pre-Meiji group named "Higanbana". However, during an operation to intercept a large exchange of firearms, she starts firing indiscriminately at the enemies in order to save a colleague that was taken as hostage, jeopardizing the safety of other Lycoris in the process. As a result, the agency dismissed her for disobeying orders. She was then transferred to work with an elite Lycoris agent Chisato Nishikigi, who is known for her involvement in the destruction of the old radio tower, on a branch of the agency that operates undercover as a café called "LycoReco". Intending to be reinstated back to the agency, Takina cooperates with Chisato on managing the café, while the peace that is being protected by the Lycoris is being challenged by terrorists led by Majima.

Characters

LycoReco

A highly skilled and happy-go-lucky Lycoris agent. She works at the LycoReco, a branch of DA that covers as a café serving both Western and Japanese sweets. Considered to be the agency's greatest agent in its history, Chisato can dodge bullets even at point blank range, a skill regarded as 'superhuman'. She uses a gun given to her when she was young by Yoshimatsu, a member of the Alan Institute, and loads it with rubber bullets. She possesses an artificial heart, provided by the Institute to extend her life. Due to a sabotage on her heart after she refused to use her abilities to kill, her lifespan drops to around two months. 

A serious and confident Lycoris agent, Takina possesses immense skills as a Lycoris agent, often going out of her way to complete missions on her own. After she indiscriminately fires at the enemies during an operation to intercept a firearms transaction in order to save a colleague, the agency dismisses her, as she ignored orders and compromised the lives of the other agents at the scene. The agency transfers her to LycoReco. Wanting to be reinstated, she cooperates with Chisato on managing the café, as well as on their missions.

A skilled hacker that goes under the code name "Walnut". She is first introduced wearing a squirrel suit. She is responsible for a hack of the DA's Radiata, an artificial intelligence regarded as being impenetrable. However, when her life becomes in danger due to competition from her rival "Robota", she requests security from LycoReco. After she was "killed" by mercenaries working under Robota, she starts living and working at LycoReco in exchange of support during LycoReco's missions. "Walnut" is actually the name of an artificial intelligence program that she operates.

An Afro-Japanese man who is the manager of LycoReco. He is seen by Chisato as a father figure, alongside Yoshimatsu.  Like Yoshimatsu, he also saw Chisato as a weapon for killing, though he later underwent a change of heart. He is a former DA instructor who left the organization, though he still supports them through LycoReco.

A worker at LycoReco, who was previously a member of the Intelligence Division of DA. She helps Chisato during her missions, notably when the hacker Walnut requests security detail. She desperately desires to get married, even going so far as to accepting a job at the LycoReco in hopes of meeting a man.

Direct Attack

A First Lycoris agent and Takina's former team leader. She resents Takina for disobeying her orders and holds a rivalry with Chisato. She was among those who trained Chisato when she was still young.

A Second Lycoris agent who replaces Takina after she was dismissed by the agency.

The Direct Attack's commander, she oversees the operations of the entire organization. She prioritizes the secrecy of the agency from the public, even if it means using elaborate cover-ups on incidents and using Lycoris agents as scapegoats.

Alan Institute

A member of the Alan Institute. He sees Chisato as a weapon for killing, a vision he initially shared with Mika. He gave Chisato an artificial heart produced by the Institute, in hopes that she would become a skilled assassin. He frequently drops by LycoReco as a customer, though his identity is kept secret to Chisato until later in the series.

Others

An Alan Institute child who was also seen as a genius for killing and serves as the main antagonist. Unlike Chisato, Majima becomes a terrorist, seeking for a "balance" in an otherwise peaceful world. He is involved in several terrorist incidents, most notably during the destruction of the old radio tower and an attack on a subway station, though both are covered up by DA. He works with the hacker Robota to expose DA to the public, and took an interest with Chisato after their encounter at the old radio tower attack. As he was initially born blind, he has developed a strong sense of hearing, which he can use to recognize people and events.

A hacker wearing a robot-shaped headgear who works with Majima in exposing DA. He regards himself as the "world's greatest hacker" after he "killed" Walnut. He provides support for Majima and his group.

Development and production
When Asaura's former editor-in-charge had a meeting about Saekano with Shin-ichirō Kashiwada, a producer from A-1 Pictures, he talked about Asaura's works, "this guy is crazy." He then introduced Asaura to Kashiwada. Later, Asaura received an invitation to a new anime project. Kashiwada had read Asaura's Death Need Round, which is a "girls with guns" work before he invited Asaura to the project. Asaura, therefore, decided to include guns in the new story. He created the main characters and the worldview, with some deliverables including the synopsis and a few short novels. Asaura's initial pitch was rejected as too violent and dark to be broadcast on television, and was eventually reworked to have a lighter tone after Adachi joined the project as director.

In Lycoris Recoil, some scenes take place in Sumida, Tokyo and features Kinshichō Park, Sumida Aquarium, water bus on Sumida River, aerial view of Ryōgoku, etc.

Media

Anime

The series was announced in December 2021. It was produced by A-1 Pictures and directed by Shingo Adachi, and features an original story by Asaura, character designs by Imigimuru, and music composed by Shūhei Mutsuki. The series aired from July 2 to September 24, 2022, on Tokyo MX, GYT, GTV, and BS11. Aniplex of America licensed the series outside of Asia and streamed it on Crunchyroll for an English simulcast and SimulDub, from August 20, 2022. Plus Media Networks Asia licensed the series in Southeast Asia and they released it on Aniplus Asia. 

On February 11, 2023, a new animation project was announced.

Episode list

Manga
A manga adaptation of Lycoris Recoil by Yasunori Bizen began serialization in Media Factory's manga magazine Monthly Comic Flapper on September 5, 2022. An official anthology was released on December 22, 2022.

Light novel
A spin-off light novel, titled Lycoris Recoil: Ordinary Days by Asaura was published under ASCII Media Works' Dengeki Bunko imprint on September 9, 2022.

Stage play
A stage play adaptation was announced on November 18, 2022. It was performed at Tennozu Galaxy Theater from January 7 to January 15, 2023, produced by Office Endless, directed by Akira Yamazaki, and written by Yо̄ Hosaka.

Reception

Audience response
Lycoris Recoil ranked first in the Anime Corner Summer 2022 Weekly Poll chart for three consecutive weeks since its premiere and would eventually top the site's Summer 2022 Anime of the Season Ranking. The series would end up in 8th place for Anime Corner's 2022 Anime of the Year Ranking. In a survey of "Favorite TV Anime of 2022" by Japanese anime website AnimeAnime.jp, Lycoris Recoil ended up on the number one spot, with a reported 12.3% of the overall vote. As of August 24, 2022, Lycoris Recoil became the "Most-Watched Anime from the summer season" in Japan, ranking 6th place overall among the "Top 10 Most-Watched Anime in Japan" for August 2022; the series retained 6th place on the list for September 2022.

In a tweet, Metal Gear series creator Hideo Kojima praised Lycoris Recoil. Kojima later accepted a request to write an endorsement which was slated to be featured on the cover of Lycoris Recoil: Ordinary Days, the series' then upcoming light novel spinoff. On August 22, 2022, Kadokawa stated that the novel had sold so well in pre-orders that they had requested a second printing ahead of its September 9 release, which series creator Asaura noted was a rare occurrence.

Sales
The first volume of the Blu-ray release became the "Best-Selling TV Anime Disc" in Japan, with around 29,414 copies sold as of November 19, 2022. The second volume of the Blu-ray release sold around 22,322 copies in its first five days of sales. The third volume of the Blu-ray release sold 23,937 copies as of November 27, 2022. The fourth volume of the Blu-ray release sold 21,534 copies as of December 25, 2022.

In its yearly sales chart, Oricon revealed that Lycoris Recoil: Ordinary Days became the fifth best selling individual light novel volume in Japan, having sold an estimated 142,610 physical copies.

Critical reception
Contributors at Anime News Network and Anime Feminist gave the series a mixed reception. The series was praised for the characters and visuals, but was also criticized for its "glorification" of political and state violence. In the site's full review of the first three episodes, published later, Christopher Farris praised the series for its revival of the girls with guns subgenre, the characters, and action sequences. However, he expressed some concern that the show's attempt to combine the genre with slice of life story elements could become "mere distractions" and potentially sidestep any narrative address of the premise's political implications.

Discussing the first four episodes in Anime Feminists "check-in" for the summer 2022 anime season, Caitlin Moore described the series as strong entertainment, praising the action, visuals, and character designs, as well as the possible queer subtext of the relationships in the show but noted the perceived tonal dissonance and continued lack of clarity as to its moral or political positions on the subject matter of state violence.

Accolades

See also
 Ben-To: light novel series by the original story provider, Asaura.
 This Art Club Has a Problem!: manga series by the character designer, Imigimuru.

Notes

References

External links
 
 

2022 anime television series debuts
2022 Japanese novels
A-1 Pictures
Action anime and manga
Anime with original screenplays
Aniplex franchises
Bandai Namco franchises
Comedy anime and manga
Crunchyroll anime
Dengeki Bunko
Dentsu
Espionage in anime and manga
Fiction about government
Fiction about rebellions
Girls with guns anime and manga
Kadokawa Dwango franchises
Media Factory manga
Science fiction anime and manga
Seinen manga
Sony Pictures Entertainment Japan franchises
Slice of life anime and manga
Television series about intelligence agencies
Television series about World War III
Television series set in the future
Television shows set in Tokyo
Terrorism in fiction
Tokyo MX original programming
War in anime and manga